Dr. Donald Mackay was deputy Director of the Ross Institute at the London School of Hygiene and Tropical Medicine.  He worked for many years in tropical occupational health, especially on the tea plantations of South Asia.  He died in 1981.

Donald Mackay Medal

The Donald Mackay Medal is awarded in his honor for outstanding work in tropical health, especially relating to improvements in the health of rural or urban workers in the tropics.

The award criteria are determined by the :
 Trustees of the Mackay Memorial Fund 
 Councils of the Royal Society of Tropical Medicine and Hygiene 
 American Society of Tropical Medicine and Hygiene

The medal is awarded annually, by the Royal Society of Tropical Medicine and Hygiene in even-numbered years by the American Society of Tropical Medicine and Hygiene in odd-numbered years. It was first awarded in 1990.

Recipients
Medal recipients are:

See also

 List of medicine awards

References

Tropical medicine
Royal Society of Tropical Medicine and Hygiene